Spectre is a SPICE-class circuit simulator owned and distributed by the software company Cadence Design Systems. It provides the basic SPICE analyses and component models. It also supports the Verilog-A modeling language. Spectre comes in enhanced versions that also support RF simulation (SpectreRF) and mixed-signal simulation (AMS Designer).

Specifications

List of supported device models
 Advanced-node models, including the latest versions of the BSIM CMG, BSIM IMG, and UTSOI models
 MOSFET models, including the latest versions of the BSIM3, BSIM4, BSIM Bulk (BSIM6), PSP, and HiSIM
 High-voltage MOS models, including the latest versions of the HiSIM HV, MOS9, MOS11, and EKV 
 Silicon on insulator (SOI), including latest versions of BTASOI, SSIMSOI, BSIMSOI, BSIMSOI PD, and HiSIM SOI 
 Bipolar junction transistor (BJT) models, including the latest versions of VBIC, HICUM, Mextram, HBT, and Gummel-Poon models 
 Diode models, including the diode, Phillips level 500, and CMC diode models
 JFET models, including the JFET, Phillips level 100 JFET, and Individual dual-gate JFET models
 IGBT models, including PSpice® IGBT model and HiSIM IGBT models
 Resistors, including linear resistor, diffused resistor, CMC two-terminal and three-terminal resistor, and physical resistor models 
 GaAs MESFET models, includes latest versions of GaAs, TOM2, TOM3, and Angelov
 GaN MESFET models, including Angelov, ASM, and MVSG models 
 Silicon TFT models, including RPI Poly-Silicon and Amorphous silicon Thin-Film models
 Verilog-A compact device models 
 Z and S domain sources
 User-defined compiled model interface (CMI), allowing for the rapid inclusion of user-defined models 
 Josephson Junctions
 Specialized reliability models (AgeMOS) for simulating the effect of HCI and BTI 
 Miscellaneous power models, including the relay, transformer, non-linear magnetic core, and winding
 Miscellaneous RF models, including the DC block, DC feedthrough, and microstrip and stripline elements (bend, cross, corner, curve, open line, tee models)

Language and Netlist support 
The netlist formats, behavioral modeling languages, parasitic netlist formats, and stimulus files are common across the Spectre Simulation Platform. Supported formats include:
 Spectre and SPICE netlist formats
 Spectre, SPICE, and PSpice models 
 Verilog-A 2.0 LRM-compliant behavioral models and structural netlists
 DSPF/SPEF parasitic formats
 S-parameter data files in Touchstone, CITI-file, and Spectre formats
 SST2, PSF, PSF XL, and FSDB waveform formats
 Digital vector (VEC), Verilog-Value Change Dump (VCD), Extended Verilog-Value Change Dump (EVCD), and digital stimulus

Spectre simulation options 
 The Spectre X-RF Option provides accurate and fast simulation for RFIC circuits and includes periodic steady-state, small-signal, and noise analyses along with harmonic balance (HB) analysis capabilities to maximize performance without loss in accuracy. Taking advantage of the Spectre X architecture, HB analysis can be distributed to multiple cores to power through the simulation task faster
 The Spectre CPU Accelerator Option enables multi-thread simulation for transient and periodic steady-state analysis, extremely useful for verification of parasitic back-annotated designs across multiple CPUs
 The Spectre Power Option provides dedicated transistor-level electro-migration and IR drop (EM-IR) analysis that can be used on the command line or within the front-to-back flow, leveraging the Cadence Voltus-Fi Custom Power Integrity Solution
 Part of the Cadence Safety Solution providing fast fault injection and simulation to accelerate the functional safety closure of analog/mixed-signal designs

Spectre products

History 

Spectre was developed at Cadence Design Systems by Ken Kundert and Jacob K. White. The software is continuously being improved upon and developed further to bring high quality, accurate analog simulation.
Spectre is currently a leading circuit simulator, competing with HSPICE and several others.

References 
 

Electronic circuit simulators